Zubeir is both a given name and a surname. Notable people with the surname include:

Zubeir Ahmed El-Sharif (born 1934), Libyan politician
Zubeir Ali Maulid (born 1968), Tanzanian politician
Said Zubeir (born 1969), Tanzanian politician
Shaima Zubeir, Iraqi television presenter

See also
Gabriel Zubeir Wako (born 1941), South Sudanese cardinal